Emmanuel Bible College is an interdenominational Evangelical Christian Bible college located in Kitchener, Ontario, Canada.

History 

In response to a need for trained Christian leaders, the  college was established in 1940 as a Bible school in Stouffville, Ontario by Ward M Shantz. It then shortly relocated to Gormley, Ontario. In 1943 the school was moved to downtown Kitchener, Ontario (now site of Centre In The Square on Ahrens near Queen Street) and then, in 1964, to the current location at 100 Fergus Avenue in Kitchener.

In 1982 the college received its accreditation by the Association for Biblical Higher Education, following the passing of a provincial Act giving it the right to grant degrees.

Mission
Emmanuel exists to provide training in Christian discipleship and ministry to persons of all ages through both degree programs and nonformal training that includes online courses and certificates and regularly offered workshops under the name "Refresh".   The college's mission statement is: "Through academic training and hands on ministry and service, Emmanuel prepares Christ followers who are committed to making a difference in their world."

Campus 
The campus is currently undergoing changes, and consists of three main buildings.

 J.H. Sherk Education Centre - named for Rev. J. Harold Sherk, a member of the college's original faculty 
 Edna Pridham Memorial Library - named for the college's first missionary, who died while serving in Nigeria 
 Warder Hall - named for Mrs. Maude Warder, a member of the college's original staff

Originally held in the basements of the Stouffville and Gormley Mennonite Brethren in Christ Churches, Emmanuel purchased a house on Ahrens St. in Kitchener, Ontario in 1943. The college met on Ahrens St. until 1964, when it moved to its location on Fergus Ave. with a newly constructed administration building. The Faith Missionary Church building was also sold to Emmanuel around this time.

Before changes to the campus began in 2018, the college also owned and used several other buildings on its Fergus Ave. property.

 Ward M. Shantz Chapel - named for the founding President of the college
 Ellis A. Lageer Administration Building - named for the college's fourth President 
 Emmanuel Campus Centre - originally named Edgewood Hall
 Lehman Hall - named for an original member of the college's faculty 
 Wideman Hall - named for the college's second President

Programs Offered 
Emmanuel is a Bible College with the distinction of offering both Degree and Diploma programs focusing on a variety of faith and ministry disciplines. These programs include a four-year Bachelor of Theology program (BTh) as well as a three-year Bachelor of Religious Education (BRE). These programs offer a variety of major choices, as well as double-major options.  As well, the school offers a variety of short-term diploma and certificates, such as the one year MountainTop program and a Professional Studies Certificate in Addictions Counselling. The ministry training programs are a blend of: Bible and Theology courses (a major); General Studies; Professional courses; Field Education, Internships, and Co-ops.

Distance education
Distance Education courses are available to anyone interested in pursuing educational opportunities at Emmanuel. For some students, DE provides a chance to begin a Bible college education either as an occasional student or to enter a program. For others, DE courses supplement the in-class offerings, providing flexibility in scheduling. Students in any certificate, diploma or degree program at Emmanuel may take up to half of their courses by DE.

Partnerships
EBC is affiliated with the Evangelical Missionary Church of Canada, the Congregational Christian Churches in Canada, the Christian & Missionary Alliance, the Be In Christ Church of Canada, the Mennonite Brethren Church, the United Brethren Churches in Canada, and the Evangelical Fellowship of Canada.

The college is an accredited member with the Commission on Accreditation of the ABHE. ABHE is recognized by the American Council for Higher Education Accreditation. As well, the college is chartered by the Province of Ontario in the 2018 Emmanuel Bible College Act, which entitles EBC to confer the degrees of Bachelor of Theology (B.Th.), and Bachelor of Religious Education (B.R.E.)

References

External links
Emmanuel Bible College
Emmanuel Bible College Student Newspaper

See also

 List of colleges and universities named after people
 Ontario Student Assistance Program
Evangelicalism
Brethren in Christ Church
Evangelical Missionary Church
Emerging church
New Monasticism

1940 establishments in Ontario
Bible colleges
Education in the Regional Municipality of Waterloo
Education in the Regional Municipality of York
Universities in Ontario
Educational institutions established in 1940
Evangelical seminaries and theological colleges in Canada
Schools in Kitchener, Ontario
Private universities and colleges in Canada
Interdenominational seminaries and theological colleges